Glocal University is a private and coeducational institution located in Saharanpur, Uttar Pradesh, India. It is situated in the foothills of Shivalik mountains. The university is a non-profit university established by the Uttar Pradesh Private Universities Act, 2011, (U.P. Act no. 2 of 2012) and is recognized by University Grant Commission. In keeping with its vision of Global canvass, local colours, the school's name is a portmanteau of "global" and "local". The university's 6 major schools offer more than 35 undergraduate, post-graduate, and professional courses.

Facilities

Campus
Glocal's self-contained campus is spread across 350 acres.  It is situated close to the urban industrial cities of Saharanpur and Dehradun, on the Dehradun-Saharanpur Road. The university is approximately a two hours by car from Dehradun's Jolly Grant Airport.

Glocal University is a part of the Grand Peak Group.

Classrooms and laboratories
Glocal's teaching spaces include classrooms, larger lecture halls, and an amphitheatre. They are equipped with multimedia equipment to aid in instruction.

Glocal's engineering laboratories are located in a separate block from the classrooms. They are designed to encourage experimentation, practical application of classroom concepts, and independent work. The lab facilities are used for practical experiments and during academic tests. The laboratories are accessible at all times, although students must sign up for lab time in advance.

Library
The library is a central support to the university's teaching, learning, and research programmes. Its facilities are available for students, faculty members, and university employees.

Its collection includes CDs and DVDs; books on engineering, science, bioinformatics, humanities, social sciences and mass communication; and copies of research publications. The university is also expanding its holdings through an online portal to major libraries around the world.

Hostels
Glocal University is a residential campus, with separate in-campus hostels for males and females. The overall capacity for each hostel is 1030 students. Each room is equipped with bed, study table with chair, and almirah. As a whole, the hostels are equipped with air conditioning, RO-filtered drinking water, an uninterrupted power supply, wireless internet, television sets in common rooms, 24-hour security (with special attention to female residents), gymnasium facilities, medical facilities and a bank.

Meals are prepared on-campus under the supervision of a dietician and professional manager. Cuisines include Indian, Chinese, and European.

Athletics
The institute provides coaches and physical facilities for students to keep them engaged and physically fit. The Glocal campus includes basketball and volleyball courts, cricket and football fields, table tennis equipment, a running track, and a swimming pool. The university's well-maintained landscaping also encourages outdoor activities.

Administration

Leadership 

Dr. P K Bharti  is the Vice Chancellor of the Glocal University Saharanpur (Uttar Pradesh)

The academic council consists of Dr. Kashi Balachandran, Dr. Rajiv Kumar, Syed Safawi, and Prof.(Dr.)Rizwan Ahmad. The university's advisory group constitutes a mix of policy makers and experts in their respective disciplines.

Campus placements 
The university has a placement office for students, headed by Indrajit Gupta. Other members of the office consist of alumni from the Indian Institutes of Management and distinguished individuals from industrial, media and legal sectors.

The institute has strong ties with the corporate sector. Internships are available with noted Indian and international companies.

Academic profile

Curriculum 
The curriculum allows students to switch between courses and disciplines. This ensures flexibility and exposure to learning.

Exchange programs with foreign universities also offer Glocal students a first-hand experience of global trends.

Accreditation
The Glocal University is approved by the University Grants Commission (UGC), the All India Council for Technical Education (AICTE), and the Bar Council of India (BCI).

Departments and courses
The institute has major schools for instruction in technology, business and commerce, law, and health sciences. Each school has various courses to offer.

Glocal School of Technology 
The Glocal School of Technology comprises the B.Tech program, the Department of Computer Science, and the Department of Natural & Applied Sciences. Together, the School of Technology awards the following degrees:
 BTech in Civil Engineering
 BTech in Computer Science
 BTech in Electrical Engineering
 BTech in Electronics & Communication
 BTech in Mechanical Engineering
 BTech in Petroleum Engineering
 BCA (Bachelor of Computer Applications)
 BSc in Mathematics
 MCA (Master of Computer Applications)

School of Business and Commerce
 BBA (Bachelor of Business Administration)
 BCom (Bachelor of Commerce)
 MBA in Finance
 MBA in Human Resource Management
 MBA in Marketing

School of Law
The School of Law offers two 5-year integrated programs:
 BA – LLB
 BBA – LLB
LLB
LLM

School of Life and Allied Health Science
 BSc in Agriculture
 BSc in Biotechnology
 BSc in Medical Lab Technology
 BSc in Medical Microbiology
 BSc in Microbiology

School of Pharmacy
 D.Pharm (Diploma in Pharmacy)
 B.Pharm (Bachelor of Pharmacy)
 M.Pharm (Master of Pharmacy)
School of Nursing 
 B.Sc (Nursing)
A N M 
School of Paramedical 
BMLT
 B.Sc(Optometric)
B.Sc (Renal dylasis)

Inactive schools
The former School of Education & Research previously awarded post-graduate degrees in Guidance and Counselling, Educational Management and Leadership, and Education.

The former School of Media & Cultural Studies previously awarded undergraduate and post-graduate degrees in Media Studies and Media/Cultural Studies.

References

External links 
Official website
Glocal University Blog

Business schools in Uttar Pradesh
Education in Saharanpur
Educational institutions established in 2012
2012 establishments in Uttar Pradesh
Private universities in Uttar Pradesh